Annavarapu Rama Swamy (born 27 March 1926) is an Indian classical violinist from Andhra Pradesh, India.

Career

He is known for his contributions in the field of Carnatic music. He is noted for inventing new Ragas and Talas such as Vandana Raga, Sri Durga Raga and Tinetradi Tala and Vedadi Tala. In 2021, he was awarded India's fourth-highest civilian award the Padma Shri in the Arts and Literature category. He was awarded the Fellowship of Andhra Pradesh Sangeeta Akademi in 1983.

Awards and recognition 
 Sangeet Natak Akademi Award, by the Government of India, 1996
 Fellowship of Andhra Pradesh Sangeet Akademi in 1983
 Padma Shri, by the Government of India, 2021

References 

1926 births
Carnatic violinists
Indian violinists
Living people
Musicians from Andhra Pradesh
21st-century violinists
Recipients of the Padma Shri in arts
Recipients of the Sangeet Natak Akademi Award

People from West Godavari district
Carnatic composers
People from Eluru
Indian classical musicians